Thomas Docherty may refer to:

 Tommy Docherty (1928–2020), Scottish football manager
 Thomas Docherty (politician) (born 1975), MP for Dunfermline and West Fife
 Tom Docherty (1924–2020), English footballer

See also
 Thomas Doherty (disambiguation)